Salix kirilowiana is a willow species described by Sergei Sergeyevich Sheglejev. Salix kirilowiana is part of the genus Salix, and the family Salicaceae. No subspecies are listed in the Catalog of Life.

Range
It is found in mountain river valleys, especially on pebbles and gravelly alluvium; below 2500 m. in Xinjiang in the Tian Shan mountains.

References 

kirilowiana